Cyril Leonard is one of London’s longest established property firms and has grown from a small family concern at formation in 1934 to an international consultancy handling all forms of commercial property with a reach across the UK, Europe and the US.

History 
The firm was founded by brothers Cyril and Leonard Blausten as surveyors in 1934 at the Angel in north London. Then with one month’s free rent courtesy of their father and an Olympia typewriter as working capital the business began and has flourished ever since.

Within ten years they opened a second office at 52 Brook Street in the West End during the Second World War, giving the two brothers an opportunity to begin their careers in development. It was in these early post-war years that Cyril Blausten formed strong friendships with other big name son the London property scene: Harold Samuel, Maxwell Joseph, Max Rayne, Jack Salmon and Jack Cotton.
In a period between 1959 and 1961 over 25 property companies came to the London Stock Market. For the Blausten brothers their first public vehicle was Simo Securities Trust, formerly an Indonesian Rubber Company shell.  From then on a string of development projects in London, Guildford, Manchester and other booming areas were completed as the company became part of the drive to regenerate Britain.

By 1970 Simo had grown to include, by acquisition, a merchant bank and a Lloyds Underwriting Agency. Just as Simo was turning into a property based financial conglomerate the company succumbed to a hostile takeover bid from Town and Commercial Properties.

The physical devastation in post-war Britain’s major cities had presented a serious financial problem for the governments of Churchill and Attlee. However the period was a ripe opportunity for young entrepreneurs to take the lead, and so they did in an unprecedented way in Europe. Many, either refugees or sons of refugees, found freedom and sanctuary from persecution in the UK and began a development spree that lasted through to 1974 as the country was rebuilt.

In addition to commercial and corporate activity Cyril Blausten formed a strong relationship with George Wimpey and through Winglaw Properties together developed and regenerated  of land on the Ilchester Estate in Abbotsbury Road and St Mary Abbots Terrace on Kensington High Street.

Cyril Blausten himself found time to devote to the Jewish Board of Guardians, now Jewish Care, becoming Hon Secretary, Vice Chairman and Vice President. As Chairman of the Property Committee he helped oversee one of the largest residential care home development programmes after the war.

From the mid 1970s Cyril concentrated on his private property investment companies, his financial investments and Cyril Leonard from which he retired as Senior Partner in 1996, remaining as a Consultant until 2000. Cyril Blausten died in December 2006. Douglas and Simon, two of his four sons are still senior partners within the firm.

Cyril Leonard today 

The firm now operates from offices in Mayfair, London where it works with a variety of clients in the UK and in Munich from where most of its European clients are managed. Current clients include ALSTOM, AEA Technology, Abbott Laboratories and Royal London and services range from investment and asset management to building and corporate consultancy, development funding and leasing.

Directors 
Cyril Leonard Ltd's Directors are Simon Blausten, Andrew Hogge, Mark Harrison, Oliver Spero, Simon Rooke and Jonathan Slater.

References

External links 
 Cyril Leonard UK website
 Cyril Leonard Germany website

Property services companies of the United Kingdom
Property companies based in London